Nabagram  is a census town in the Raghunathpur II CD block in the Raghunathpur subdivision of the Purulia district in West Bengal, India.

Geography

Location

Area overview
Purulia district forms the lowest step of the Chota Nagpur Plateau. The general scenario is undulating land with scattered hills.Raghunathpur subdivision occupies the northern part of the district. 83.80% of the population of the subdivision  lives in rural areas. However, there are pockets of urbanization and 16.20% of the population lives in urban areas. There are 14 census towns in the subdivision. It is presented in the map given alongside. There is a coal mining area around Parbelia and two thermal power plants are there – the 500 MW Santaldih Thermal Power Station and the 1200 MW Raghunathpur Thermal Power Station. The subdivision has a rich heritage of old temples, some of them belonging to the 11th century or earlier. The Banda Deul is a monument of national importance. The comparatively more recent in historical terms, Panchkot Raj has interesting and intriguing remains in the area.

Note: The map alongside presents some of the notable locations in the subdivision. All places marked in the map are linked in the larger full screen map.

Demographics
According to the 2011 Census of India Nabagram had a total population of 5,963 of which 3,105 (52%) were males and 2,858 (48%) were females. There were 794 persons in the age range of 0–6 years. The total number of literate persons in Nabagram was 3,814 (74% of the population over 6 years).

 India census, Nabagram had a population of 5,642. Males constitute 53% of the population and females 47%. Nabagram has an average literacy rate of 58%, lower than the national average of 59.5%: male literacy is 71%, and female literacy is 44%. In Nabagram, 15% of the population is under 6 years of age.

Infrastructure
According to the District Census Handbook 2011, Puruliya, Nabagram covered an area of 2.88 km2. There is a railway station at Santaldih, 2 km away. Among the civic amenities, the protected water supply involved overhead tank, tube-well, bore-well, tap water from treated source. It had 435 domestic electric connections. Among the medical facilities it had 1 veterinary hospital, 2 medicine shops. Among the educational facilities it had were 4 primary schools, 1 middle school, 1 secondary school, the nearest senior secondary school at Santaldih 3 km away, the nearest general degree college at Raghunathpur 20 km away.

Economy
Ispat Damodar of the Eurasia group producing sponge iron, mild steel billets and ferro alloys have their manufacturing facilities at Nabagram.

Culture
Banda Deul, located nearby, an 11th-century temple, is a monument of national importance.

References

Cities and towns in Purulia district